Motu Tofari is a  island in the Bora Bora Islands Group, within the Society Islands of French Polynesia. It is the located between Taufarii, and Ome.

The island has some private households.

Administration
The island is part of Bora Bora Commune.

Demographics
Tenamanu, the main village of the island, is on the north west corner, next to the Four Seasons Resort.
Its current population includes many private households as the resorts staff usually commute daily to the piers of the resorts

Tourism
The Island boasts many resorts.
 Near the island of Taufarii, is St. Regis Resort. 
The resort has extended Tofari with an artificial island inside the lagoon.
 Four Seasons operates the large Four Seasons Resort Bora Bora

Wildlife
Ruahatu Lagoon Sanctuary is located on the island.

Transportation

After arriving in Fa'a'ā International Airport, an Air Tahiti inter-island flight (50 minutes) will bring you to Bora Bora Airport.

You will need to board the airline's catamaran shuttle to Vaitape, where resorts staff take boats to the island.

References